Ryan McCarthy may refer to:

 Ryan McCarthy (rugby union) (born 1979), New Zealand rugby union footballer
 Ryan D. McCarthy, United States Secretary of the Army
 Ryan McCarthy (American football), American football coach